Thomas Little (born 23 February 1985) is an Australian comedian, writer, actor, television and radio presenter. He currently co-hosts Carrie & Tommy on the Hit Network with Carrie Bickmore. He formerly was a co-host on The Project on Network 10.

Career
In 2013, Little performed at the Melbourne International Comedy Festival and appeared at the festival's Gala show, which showcases five-minute sets of dozens of comedians. In early 2014, he returned to the Melbourne International Comedy Festival with a new show, "Middleclass Gangster", in 2019 with his show "Self Diagnosed Genius"  and in 2021 "I'll See Myself Out".

Little has also performed live on Foxtel.

Television 
Little has appeared on Melbourne International Comedy Festival, Celebrity Name Game, Studio 10, The Project and Hughesy, We Have a Problem.

In 2008, Little began writing for Channel 31's talk show, Studio A hosted by Dave Thornton and produced by RMITV. During Little's stint on cast and writing team, Studio A won two Antenna Awards for both Program of the Year and Best Comedy at the 2009 ceremony. By 2010, Little had established himself as an important member of the cast and writing team and was promoted to host. After the sixth season of Studio A, RMITV management stated in a press release that they would be making changes to their Flagship Production in 2012 and announced that a new program, Live on Bowen, would be the show's successor.

In 2012, Little appeared at the Warehouse Comedy Festival, which converts an old warehouse into a pop-up comedy venue and films one-hour shows for viewing on the ABC.

In 2013, Little was announced as host of Network Ten's comedy and entertainment series, A League of Their Own and co-host of comedy chat show This Week Live alongside Dave Thornton, Tom Gleeson and Meshel Laurie. He also played Claudia Karvan's love interest on the ABC drama Time of our Lives

Little has been the comedic panelist on Ten's prime time entertainment news program The Project, filling the spot of regular Peter Helliar since 2014.

In 2016, Little hosted Whose Line Is It Anyway? Australia, an improvisational comedy show, based on the British show of the same name on Foxtel network's The Comedy Channel.

Little's television debut was many years before he shot to fame, when he featured on two episodes of "Rex Hunt’s Fishing Adventures" as a youngster.

In 2020 following lockdowns in Melbourne Little performed a show with live audience at Melbourne International Comedy Festival 'Tommy Little: Self-Diagnosed Genius' which was distributed on Amazon.  As part of the show Little stated he was single and uncircumcised, to the relief of the audience. Tommy is also a advocate for 10% less taco toppings which pairs well with his already stern stance on urination on his chest.

Radio 
Little regularly filled in for Hughesy & Kate on Nova 100 whilst they were on holidays. In October 2013, Nova 100 announced that Little would join Meshel Laurie to host Meshel & Tommy early December 2013, replacing Hughesy & Kate. In October 2015, Little announced that he would be leaving Nova 100 at the end of the year.

In January 2017, Southern Cross Austereo announced that Little and Carrie Bickmore would host Carrie & Tommy across the Hit Network. The show airs weekdays from 3pm to 6pm.

Charity 
In December 2018, Little set out and completed the Antarctic Ice Marathon in an effort to raise money for Project Edge, a collaboration by Rectal Injuries Australia and University of Technology Sydney. They raised over $114,000.

References

External links
 Tommy Little
 Nova 100

Australian male television actors
Australian male comedians
Nova (radio network) announcers
Living people
RMITV alumni
Australian people of Croatian descent
1985 births